Hans Günther Aach (2 October 1919 – 4 December 1999) was a German botanist.

Life 
Aach was born in Oldenburg. He gained his doctorate in March 1952 in the Faculty of Mathematics and Natural Sciences of the University of Göttingen. In July 1961 he presented his professorial thesis at the University of Cologne. He spent several months as visiting faculty at University of California, Berkeley and Stanford University. On 31 December 1962 he was appointed Extraordinary Professor of Botany at the RWTH Aachen University. From 12 January 1965 he was appointed to the Chair of Botany in the same place and made director of the Botanical Institute. He retired on 1 March 1984.

The emphasis of his scientific work was on proteins in viruses. He collaborated on the Handbuch der Biologie.

Aach died in Aachen in December 1999 at the age of 80.

Works 
 Abriss der Botanik für Studenten der Medizin und der Naturwissenschaften. Berlin 1948
 Über Wachstum und Zusammensetzung von Chlorella pyrenoidosa bei unterschiedlichen Lichtstärken und Nitratmengen. Göttingen 1952
 Die Viren. Akademische Verlags-Gesellschaft Athenaion, Konstanz 1960
 Zur Konstanz der Aminosäurenzusammensetzung im Eiweißanteil des Tabakmosaikvirus. Köln 1961
 Zum Problem der Viruseiweisssynthese in zellfreien Chlorellasystemen. Westdeutscher Verlag, Köln 1968

Literature 
 Kürschners deutscher Gelehrten-Kalender. Vol. 1, 1966.

Notes and references

External links 
 

1919 births
1999 deaths
20th-century German botanists
People from Oldenburg (city)
Academic staff of RWTH Aachen University
Academic staff of the University of Cologne
University of Göttingen alumni